Michael Francis Gregson (born 27 January 1929), known professionally as Michael Craig, is a British actor and screenwriter, known for his work in theatre, film and television both in the United Kingdom and in Australia.

Biography 
Craig was born in Poona, British India, the son of Donald Gregson, who served in the 3rd Indian Cavalry as a captain.
He was the elder brother of film producer and screenwriter Richard Gregson.

Acting career

Theatre

Craig began his entertainment career in the theatre. His first job was as an assistant stage manager at the Castle Theatre, Farnham, England in 1950. His stage credits include A Whistle in the Dark (Apollo Theatre, 1961), Wars of the Roses (RSC at Stratford 1963–64), Funny Girl (with Barbra Streisand at the Prince of Wales Theatre 1966), Pinter's The Homecoming (Music Box Theatre, Broadway 1966–67) and the lead role in Trying in Australia in 2007 and at the Finborough Theatre, London, in 2009.

Screen: Film and television

Craig made his film debut in a non-speaking part, as an uncredited extra in 1949. He was then talent-spotted at the Oxford Playhouse and gained his first speaking part in an uncredited role in Malta Story (1953). He gained his first credited role the following year in 1954, in The Embezzler Groomed as a star by the Rank Organisation, he appeared in a number of films, including Campbell's Kingdom (1957),  Sea of Sand (1958), The Silent Enemy (1958), Sapphire (1959), Doctor in Love (1960), Cone of Silence (1960), Mysterious Island (1961), The Iron Maiden (1962), A Choice of Kings, Modesty Blaise (1966), Turkey Shoot (1982), Ride a Wild Pony (1975) and Appointment with Death (1988). He received a BAFTA Best actor nomination for his performance in Sea of Sand (1958).

In October 1956, John Davis, managing director of Rank, announced him as one of the actors under contract that Davis thought would become an international star.

His television credits include Arthur of the Britons (1973), The Emigrants (1976), Rush (1976), The Danedyke Mystery (1979), The Professionals (1980), Shoestring (1980), The Timeless Land (1980), Triangle (1981–83), Tales of the Unexpected (1982), Robin of Sherwood (1986), Doctor Who (in the serial Terror of the Vervoids 1986), the Australian series G.P. (1989–95), Brides of Christ (1991), Grass Roots (2000) and Always Greener (2003). He was the subject of an hour-long interview on his life and career recorded for and broadcast on Talking Pictures TV in 2018.

Scriptwriting credits 

Craig's scriptwriting credits include the ABC-TV trilogy The Fourth Wish (1974), which starred John Meillon in an award-winning performance as the father of a dying boy. Craig also wrote the screenplay for the feature film The Fourth Wish (1976), which was produced following the success of the television series.
Alongside his co-writers, Richard Gregson (his brother) and Bryan Forbes, Craig was nominated for an Academy Award for the screenplay of The Angry Silence (1960).

Personal life

Craig's first wife was Babette Collier. His second is the Australian actress Susan Walker. He is the father of Jessica Gregson; his brother was the film producer Richard Gregson and, because of Richard's marriage to Natalie Wood, Craig is an uncle of the actress Natasha Gregson Wagner. His autobiography, The Smallest Giant: An Actor's Life, was published in 2005.

Selected filmography 

 Passport to Pimlico (1949) – (uncredited)
 The Lady with a Lamp (1951) – Wounded soldier
 Malta Story (1953) – British Officer (uncredited)
 The Love Lottery (1954) – Cameraman Assistant (uncredited)
 The Embezzler (1954) – Dr. Forrest
 Svengali (1954) – Zouzou
 Passage Home (1955) – Burton
 The Black Tent (1956) – Sheik Faris
 Yield to the Night (1956) – Jim Lancaster
 Eyewitness (1956) – Jay Church
 House of Secrets (1956) – Larry Ellis / Steve Chancellor (dec.)
 High Tide at Noon (1957) – Nils
 Campbell's Kingdom (1957) – Boy Bladen
 The Silent Enemy (1958) – Leading Seaman Knowles
 Nor the Moon by Night (1958) – Rusty Miller
 Sea of Sand (1958) – Capt. Cotton
 Life in Emergency Ward 10 (1959) – Dr. Stephen Russell
 Sapphire (1959) – Inspector Phil Learoyd
 Upstairs and Downstairs (1959) – Richard Barry
 The Angry Silence (1960) – Joe Wallace
 Cone of Silence (1960) – Capt. Hugh Dallas
 Doctor in Love (1960) – Dr. Richard Hare
 Payroll (1961) – Johnny Mellors
 Mysterious Island (1961) – Capt. Cyrus Harding
 No My Darling Daughter (1961) – Thomas Barclay
 A Pair of Briefs (1962) – Tony Stevens
 Life for Ruth (1962) – John Paul Harris
 The Iron Maiden (1962) – Jack Hopkins
 The Captive City (1962) – Capt. Robert Elliott
 Stolen Hours (1963) – Dr. John Carmody
 Sandra (1965) – Andrew Dawdson
 Life at the Top (1965) – Mark
 Modesty Blaise (1966) – Paul Hagan
 Star! (1968) – Sir Anthony Spencer
 The Royal Hunt of the Sun (1969) – Estete
 Twinky (1970) – Daddy
 Country Dance (1970) – Douglas Dow
 Rendezvous with Dishonour (1970) – Colonel Stephen Mallory
 A Town Called Bastard (1971) – Paco
 The Vault of Horror (1973) – Maitland (segment 4 "Bargain in Death")
 Last Rites (1975) – Eric Cordett
 Inn of the Damned (1975) – Paul Melford
 Ride a Wild Pony (1975) – James Ellison
 The Emigrants (1976) – Bill Parker
 The Fourth Wish (1976) – Dr. Richardson
 The Irishman (1978) – Paddy Doolan
 Turkey Shoot (1982) – Charles Thatcher
 Appointment with Death (1988) – Lord Peel
 Fat Pizza (2003) – Judge
 The Incredible Journey of Mary Bryant (2005) – Judge Stephens

References

External links 
 
 
 
 Review for Trying in Australia 2007

1929 births
Living people
British expatriates in Australia
British male film actors
Australian male film actors
British male television actors
Australian male television actors
British male stage actors
Logie Award winners
British people in colonial India
Male actors from Pune